

This is a list of the Indiana state historical markers in Vanderburgh County.

This is intended to be a complete list of the official state historical markers placed in Vanderburgh County, Indiana, United States by the Indiana Historical Bureau. The locations of the historical markers and their latitude and longitude coordinates are included below when available, along with their names, years of placement, and topics as recorded by the Historical Bureau.  There are 6 historical markers located in Vanderburgh County.

Historical markers

See also
List of Indiana state historical markers
National Register of Historic Places listings in Vanderburgh County, Indiana

References

External links
Indiana Historical Marker Program
Indiana Historical Bureau

Vanderburgh County
Historical markers